Derwin Martina (born 19 July 1994) is a professional footballer who plays as a right back for Derde Divisie club OFC Oostzaan.

Club career

Ajax
Martina was born in Amsterdam, joining the Ajax Academy in 2008. He began his career in the youth teams of Ajax as a forward, but was moved back to play as a defender later in his career. It was youth trainer Said Ouaali who had opted to move the young forward to a more defensive role, after which comparisons of the young right back were commonly made to Michael Reiziger due to their similar playing style. In July 2013, he signed a one-year professional contract with Ajax.

RKC Waalwijk
On 25 June 2014, RKC Waalwijk signed Martina from Ajax on a free transfer. Martina signed a two-year contract with an option for an additional season. On 8 August 2014, he made his debut for RKC Waalwijk in an Eerste Divisie match against Roda JC Kerkrade, playing the full 90 minutes in a 3–2 away loss. In October 2014, Martina contracted deep vein thrombosis on a trip to Curaçao to play for the national team. He made no further appearances until after the Winter break as a result. In January 2016, his contract was terminated. Due to injuries, he only played 16 matches for RKC Waalwijk. He had missed the entire beginning of the 2015–16 season due to his injuries.

Atlantis FC
In the summer of 2016, Martina signed with Kakkonen club Atlantis FC. In September 2016, he was investigated alongside fellow Dutch players Salah Aharar, Irvingly van Eijma and Ayoub Ait Afkir for match-fixing accusations. In December 2016, the players were found innocent, but that the club had been frequently bet on by several groups of match fixers at the same time, raising suspicions of foul play.

York City
On 3 March 2017, Martina signed for National League club York City on a contract until the end of 2016–17. Immediately after playing in a reserve-team match on 7 March 2017, he was released by the club.

Achilles '29
On 15 June 2017, Martina signed for Tweede Divisie club Achilles '29.
He left the club in July 2018.

VV Noordwijk
After being a free agent for 2 years after leaving Achilles '29 he signed for Tweede Divisie club VV Noordwijk on 18 June 2020.

OFC Oostzaan
On 1 July 2021, he signed for Derde Divisie club OFC Oostzaan.

International career
On 8 January 2013, Martina was called up by Curaçao national under-20 team coach Hans Schrijver for the 2013 CONCACAF U-20 Championship in Mexico. Martina appeared in two group stage matches against Mexico and El Salvador but failed to help his team advance past the group stage of the tournament. He received his first call ups for the senior team ahead of the second round of the 2014 Caribbean Cup qualifying series against Martinique, Guadeloupe and Saint Vincent and the Grenadines contested in Guadeloupe from 8 to 12 October 2014.

Personal life
It had been reported that he was a brother to fellow footballers Cuco and Javier. However, he confirmed that he is not related to Cuco.

Career statistics

References

External links

 
 

1994 births
Living people
Footballers from Amsterdam
Dutch footballers
Curaçao footballers
Association football defenders
AFC Ajax players
Jong Ajax players
RKC Waalwijk players
Atlantis FC players
York City F.C. players
Achilles '29 players
Eerste Divisie players
Kakkonen players
Tweede Divisie players
Dutch expatriate footballers
Curaçao expatriate footballers
Expatriate footballers in England
Expatriate footballers in Finland
Dutch expatriate sportspeople in England
Dutch expatriate sportspeople in Finland
Dutch people of Curaçao descent